Ovid Township is the name of some places in the U.S. state of Michigan:

 Ovid Township, Branch County, Michigan
 Ovid Township, Clinton County, Michigan

See also 
 Ovid, Michigan, a village in Clinton County

Michigan township disambiguation pages